Geevarghese Ivanios (born 21 September 1882 as Geevarghese Panickeruveetil - died 15 July 1953) was the first metropolitan archbishop of the Syro-Malankara Catholic Church and Major Archdiocese of Trivandrum. He was the founder of Bethany Ashram order of monks and Bethany madom order of nuns. He was the first M.A. degree holder in the Malankara Church. He also served as the principal of the Kottayam M.D Seminary High School and as a professor at Serampore College. He has been declared Servant of God by Cardinal Baselios Cleemis.

Family history, childhood and education 
Geevarghese Panicker was born in Mavelikkara, Kerala, India, on 21 September 1882 to Thomas Panicker and Annamma Panicker. 

He was a descendant of the aristocratic tharavad of Panickervettil in Mavelikkara within the erstwhile Indian princely state of Travancore, currently in the Alappuzha district of Kerala. The Panickervettil family was honored with the title of 'Mylitta Panicker' bestowed upon by the Travancore rulers. 

Geevarghese Panicker had his early education in Protestant and government schools. From 1897 he attended M. D. Seminary High School, Kottayam and pursued his higher studies at Serampore College and Madras Christian College (M.C.C.). He completed his matriculation education in 1899: before which he received minor orders (of clerical life) on 20 September 1898.

Deacon 
He was ordained a deacon by Pulikkottil Dionysius then the Malankara Metropolitan of Malankara  Orthodox Syrian Church on 9 January 1900, he then continued his studies at CMS College, Kottayam and obtained a bachelor's degree in economics and Indian History from Madras Christian College. In 1907 he took a Master's Degree (MA) with distinction from the same college. On his return from Madras he was appointed principal of his alma mater, M.D. Seminary High School. During this time he led various schemes for the renewal of the Malankara Church. He organized basic church communities, commenced Bible conventions, because of this he was popularly entitled "Koodasa Semmasan" (Deacon of Sacraments).

Priestly life 
He was ordained to the priesthood as P.T. Geevarghese on 15 September 1908 by Vattasseril Dionysius then the Malankara Metropolitan of Malankara Orthodox Church. Geevarghese was popularly known as M A Achan, as he was the first priest with an MA degree in Malankara.
At the same time, he took the initiative to empower the Malankara Church with hierarchical autonomy. He became instrumental to erect Catholicate for the Malankara Church on 5 September 1912. After the establishment of Catholicate in 1912 Malankara Church divided into two, one under the leadership of Malankara Metropolitan Vatteseril Dionysius (bishop's party) and one under Anthiochan Jacobite Patriarch (Bava Party). Geevarghese was belonging to Bishop's party.

Professorship in Serampore 
In 1912 Vattasseril Dionysius received an invitation to attend a conference at Calcutta. Dionysius selected Geevarghese to accompany him to Calcutta to attend the conference. At the conference, they met Dr. Howels the principal of Serampore College who requested the Metropolitan to avail the service of Geevarghese as the professor of the College. The metropolitan permitted Geevarghese to take up the task. He made use of this opportunity to educate the Malankara Youth. About 20 young people from Kerala reached Calcutta for higher education.

At Serampore, Geevarghese got more time for prayer and contemplation. He came across the writings of Basil of Caesarea on monasticism. The Basilian monastic vision had a great influence on him. Besides the visits to the Sabarmati Ashram of Mahatma Gandhi and Santiniketan of Rabindranath Tagore gave him a new vision of Indian Sanyasa (monasticism). These experiences made him to reflect upon starting an order of missionaries to carry out the task of evangelization in India. Slowly the residence of Geevarghese and his followers at Serampore became an Ashram (Monastery), and they began to live a sort of religious life according to the monastic rules of St. Basil, adapting them to Indian culture. As he accepted this as his way of life, he resigned from the Serampore College.

Foundation of the Bethany Ashram 
On his return from Calcutta, Geevarghese looked for a location to establish an ashram. One of his friends E. John Vakeel donated  of land at Mundanmala, Ranni-Perunadu, Kerala at the meeting place of the rivers Pampa and Kakkatt. The place was thickly filled with thorny bushes and herbs. Geevarghese and his followers built a small thatched hut made out of the branches of trees and bamboo. This turned to be the first ashram in Malankara on 15 August 1919. He prayerfully searched for a name for the ashram and opened the Bible and he got the word "Bethany". He meditated upon it and came to the conclusion that it was an apt name for a religious order which upholds both contemplation and action.  Eventually the Bethany Ashram became a place of pilgrimage and spiritual experience. Spiritual retreats and discourses were given by Geevarghese especially in Passion Week. Geevarghese envisioned the ashram also being a shelter for the poor and the marginalized. Along with the Ashram, he started a house for the orphans.

While at Serampore Geevarghese was thinking of the empowerment of the Syrian Christian women through education. To realize this idea, he took initiative to give education and training to the selected group of young girls with the help of the Epiphany Sisters of England working at Serampore. He founded the Bethany Madom (literally Bethany Great House or convent) for the women religious in 1925.

Bishop of Bethany 
It was decided by the Malankara Synod to ordain Geevarghese as the Bishop of Bethany. He was ordained a bishop of the Malankara Orthodox Syrian Church by Baselios Geevarghese I on 1 May 1925. He received the name Geevarghese Ivanios.

Ecclesial communion 

On 20 September 1930, Theophilos, John Kuzhinapurath, Alexander Attupurath, and Chacko Kiliyileth made the Catholic profession of faith before Aloysius Maria Benziger, the then Bishop of Kollam. Many of the members of the Bethany orders also came into full communion with the Roman Catholic Church. This spawned the Syro-Malankara Catholic Church.

Establishment of the Syro-Malankara Catholic hierarchy 
In 1932 Geevarghese made a pilgrimage to Rome for the reunion as per the letters from Rome and met Pope Pius XI. Geevarghese received the pallium. He also participated in the thirty-second Eucharistic Congress held at Dublin, Ireland. There he met G.K. Chesterton, who said to Geevarghese "The dignified Indian gentleman, who represented this far off triumph in the Orient, had changed his neighbours by bringing them to the Roman Communion."

On his return from Rome, Geevarghese made efforts to build up the Unite Rite establishment of the Malankara Christian Community. Pope Pius XI established the Malankara Catholic hierarchy, Syro-Malankara Catholic on 11 June 1932 through the apostolic constitution Cristo pastorum principi.

Ecumenical endeavours and cultural development of the society 
Geevarghese sent missionaries to different parts of the land. Besides the newly joined bishops and priests from different Malankara denominations, he received missionaries from the Syro-Malabar Catholic Church. Joseph Kuzhinjalil, the founder of the congregation of the Daughters of Mary, was a missionary appointed by Geevarghese to work in the southern parts of the land. Under Geevarghese's leadership about 75 priests were joined from different denominations of the Malankara Church. About 150 parishes including mission stations were established. 
A lot of hindus (especially from Nadar (caste) community) also joined the Syro Malankara Catholic Church from Kanyakumari of the marthandam diocese in Tamil Nadu. 

Geevarghese established about 50 schools, and one 'A' grade college, named Mar Ivanios College. He visited U.S. President Harry S Truman, G.K. Chesterton, King George V of the United Kingdom, and George Bernard Shaw.

Silver Jubilee of episcopal ordination 
The Silver Jubilee of the episcopal ordination of Geevarghese was celebrated in 1951, and Pope Pius XII wrote to him remembering the reconciliation.

Death 
Geevarghese died on 15 July 1953 and was entombed at Saint Mary’s Cathedral, Pattom, Trivandrum.

Writings 
Girideepam - Mountain Lamp, Trans. Sr. Rehmas SIC, Cause of Canonization of Mar Ivanios, Trivandrum, 2006.

The Sacrament of Confession: A Meditative Study, Trans. Fr. Samuel Thaikkoottathil Ramban, Cause of Canonization of Mar Ivanios, Trivandrum, 2006.

The Holy Qurbono: An Appraisal and Meditation, Trans. Dr. Bishop Thomas Mar Anthonios (Antony Valiyavilayil OIC), Cause of Canonization of Mar Ivanios, Trivandrum, 2006.

The Liturgical Year: A Theological Reflection, Trans. Fr. Samuel Thaikkoottathil Ramban, Cause of Canonization of Mar Ivanios, Trivandrum, 2006.

A Guide to Malankara Religious Life, Trans. Fr. Samuel Thaikkoottathil Ramban, Cause of Canonization of Mar Ivanios, Trivandrum, 2006.

Cause of beatification and canonization 

Geevarghese was declared Servant of God (Daivadasan) a first step toward sainthood on 14 July 2007, the day prior to the 54th anniversary of his death. The proclamation was read by his third successor Cardinal Baselios Cleemis at Saint Mary’s Malankara Syrian Catholic Cathedral in Trivandrum, India and the cause for his canonization will continue.

See also
Malankara Catholic Youth Movement

References

Citations

Sources 
 "His Grace Most Rev. Geevarghese Mar Ivanios O.I.C.";  Bethany Ashram website, retrieved 10 January 2006
 
 Maragaret Gibbons, Mar Ivanios (1882–1953) Archbishop of Trivandrum: The Story of Great Conversion, Dublin, 1962.
 L. Moolaveettil, The Spiritual Life of Mar Ivanios, Kottayam, 1977.

External links 

 catholicate.net
 syromalankara.org
 catholic-hierarchy.org
 lightoflife.com
 malankaracatholicchurchuk.com

1882 births
1953 deaths
20th-century Roman Catholic archbishops in India
20th-century Eastern Catholic bishops
20th-century Indian Roman Catholic theologians
Founders of Catholic religious communities
Converts to Eastern Catholicism from Oriental Orthodoxy
Eastern Catholic Servants of God
Syro-Malankara bishops
Burials at the Cathedral of Saint Mary, Pattom
20th-century venerated Christians
Christian clergy from Kerala